Tom and Jerry: The Classic Collection is a series of Region 2 DVD sets released by Warner Home Video. The sets include selected Tom and Jerry shorts on each volume. These DVDs are available in 6 double-sided DVDs (issued in the United Kingdom) and 12 single-layer DVDs (issued throughout Europe and Australia). The DVDs in the UK were re-released as "Collector Editions", which were Digipak versions with 2 Volumes inside.

None of the cartoons in the set have been restored; all were sourced by TV prints created by Turner Entertainment in the 1990s for Cartoon Network and Boomerang airings. Some of the cartoons in these DVD sets are censored due to perceived racial stereotypes.

Shorts produced in CinemaScope are presented in pan and scan for showing on the 4:3 aspect ratio television screen, except for remake shorts The Egg and Jerry, Tops with Pops and Feedin' the Kiddie. These shorts are not in anamorphic widescreen, like the American Spotlight collections; instead, they are in a 4:3 windowbox format and appear to be sourced from the laserdisc set (The Art Of Tom and Jerry) or are an early release of the copies found on the spotlight releases.

Key 
2 denotes Cinemascope cartoons in pan and scan
3 denotes Oscar winners
4 denotes edited TV prints, mainly redubbed Mammy Two Shoes. Other edits as noted.

Volume 1 
Released on 5 April 2004 (UK version)

Collector's Edition released on 12 April 2004

Side 1 (Volume 1) 
 Puss Gets the Boot4
 The Midnight Snack4
 The Night Before Christmas
 Fraidy Cat
 Dog Trouble4
 Puss n' Toots4
 The Yankee Doodle Mouse3
 Sufferin' Cats!
 The Bowling Alley Cat
 Fine Feathered Friend
 The Lonesome Mouse4
 Baby Puss

Side 2 (Volume 2) 
 The Zoot Cat
 The Bodyguard
 Puttin' on the Dog
 Mouse Trouble3
 The Mouse Comes to Dinner
 Mouse in Manhattan 
 Tee for Two 
 Flirty Birdy4 (muted dialog of the bird)   
 Quiet Please!3
 Springtime for Thomas
 The Milky Waif4 (black face gag cut)
 Trap Happy

Volume 2 
Released on 3 May 2004

Side 1 (Volume 3) 
 Solid Serenade
 Cat Fishin'
 Part Time Pal
 The Cat Concerto3
 Dr. Jekyll and Mr. Mouse
 Salt Water Tabby
 A Mouse in the House4 (Black face gag cut)
 The Invisible Mouse
 Kitty Foiled
 The Truce Hurts4 (Black face gag cut)
 Old Rockin' Chair Tom4
 Professor Tom
 Mouse Cleaning (uncut)

Side 2 (Volume 4) 
 Polka-Dot Puss4
 The Little Orphan34 (Black face gag cut)
 Hatch Up Your Troubles
 Heavenly Puss
 The Cat and the Mermouse
 Love That Pup
 Jerry's Diary 
 Tennis Chumps
 Little Quacker
 Saturday Evening Puss4
 Texas Tom
 Jerry and the Lion
 Safety Second

Volume 3 
Normal version released on 28 June 2004

Collector Edition released on 28 June 2004

Side 1 (Volume 5) 
 Tom and Jerry in the Hollywood Bowl
 The Framed Cat4
 Cue Ball Cat
 Casanova Cat (uncut)
 Jerry and the Goldfish
 Jerry's Cousin 
 Sleepy-Time Tom4
 His Mouse Friday4 (edited)
 Slicked-up Pup
 Nit-Witty Kitty4
 Cat Napping
 The Flying Cat
 The Duck Doctor

Side 2 (Volume 6) 
 The Two Mouseketeers3
 Smitten Kitten
 Triplet Trouble
 Little Runaway
 Fit To Be Tied
 Push-Button Kitty4
 Cruise Cat
 The Dog House
 The Missing Mouse
 Jerry and Jumbo
 Johann Mouse3
 That's My Pup! 
 Just Ducky

Volume 4 
Normal version released on 26 July 2004

Collector Edition released on 28 June 2004

Side 1 (Volume 7) 
 Two Little Indians 
 Life with Tom4 (black face gag from The Little Orphan's cut)
 Puppy Tale 
 Posse Cat 
 Hic-cup Pup 
 Little School Mouse
 Baby Butch
 Mice Follies 
 Neapolitan Mouse
 Downhearted Duckling
 Pet Peeve2
 Touché, Pussy Cat!2
 Southbound Duckling2

Side 2 (Volume 8) 
 Pup on a Picnic
 Mouse for Sale
 Designs on Jerry 
 Tom and Chérie2
 Smarty Cat
 Pecos Pest
 That's My Mommy2
 The Flying Sorceress2
 The Egg and Jerry
 Muscle Beach Tom2
 Down Beat Bear2
 Blue Cat Blues2
 Barbecue Brawl2

Volume 5 
Normal version released on 23 August 2004

Collector Edition released on 18 October 2004

Side 1 (Volume 9) 
 Tops with Pops
 Timid Tabby2
 Feedin' the Kiddie4
 Mucho Mouse2
 Tom's Photo Finish2
 Happy Go Ducky2
 Royal Cat Nap2
 The Vanishing Duck2
 Robin Hoodwinked2
 Tot Watchers2

Side 2 (Volume 10) 
All 13 Gene Deitch-era cartoons are present on this DVD. (MGM cooperated with Rembrandt Films to produce them.)

 Switchin' Kitten
 Down and Outing
 It's Greek to Me-ow!
 High Steaks
 Mouse into Space
 Landing Stripling
 Calypso Cat
 Dicky Moe
 The Tom and Jerry Cartoon Kit
 Tall in the Trap
 Sorry Safari
 Buddies Thicker Than Water
 Carmen Get It!

Volume 6 
All 34 Chuck Jones-era cartoons are present on this DVD, in filmed Academy Ratio of 1.37 unlike the Chuck Jones Collection which is presitented in matted 1.75

Normal version released on 27 September 2004

Collector Edition released on 18 October 2004

Disc 1 (Volume 11) 
 Pent-House Mouse
 The Cat Above and the Mouse Below
 Is There a Doctor in the Mouse?
 Much Ado About Mousing
 Snowbody Loves Me
 The Unshrinkable Jerry Mouse
 Ah, Sweet Mouse-Story of Life
 Tom-ic Energy
 Bad Day at Cat Rock
 The Brothers Carry-Mouse-Off
 Haunted Mouse
 I'm Just Wild About Jerry
 Of Feline Bondage
 The Year of the Mouse
 The Cat's Me-Ouch!
 Duel Personality
 Jerry, Jerry, Quite Contrary

Disc 2 (Volume 12) 
 Jerry-Go-Round
 Love Me, Love My Mouse
 Puss 'n' Boats
 Filet Meow
 Matinee Mouse
 The A-Tom-Inable Snowman
 Catty Cornered
 Cat and Dupli-cat
 O-Solar Meow
 Guided Mouse-ille
 Rock 'n' Rodent                                                       
 Cannery Rodent
 The Mouse from H.U.N.G.E.R.
 Surf-Bored Cat
 Shutter Bugged Cat
 Advance and Be Mechanized
 Purr-Chance to Dream

Other notes on set 
Two cartoons have been omitted: The Million Dollar Cat and Busy Buddies. They are, however, included in the US version (Spotlight Collection Vol 1 and Vol 3).

See also 
 Tom and Jerry Spotlight Collection

Tom and Jerry